Brigadier-General Sir Robert Gordon Gilmour, 1st Baronet,  (27 February 1857 – 24 June 1939), born Robert Gordon Wolrige Gordon (he changed his name in 1887), was a British army officer and Captain of the Royal Company of Archers.

Biography
Gilmour joined the British Army when he was commissioned a second lieutenant in the Grenadier Guards on 25 January 1878. He served in the Anglo-Zulu War in 1879, was promoted to lieutenant on 1 July 1881, and served in the Sudanese campaign 1884–85. Promotion to captain followed on 23 July 1890, and to major on 25 August 1896. He served in the 2nd Battalion of the regiment in South Africa during the Second Boer War 1900–1902. For his service in the war, he received the Distinguished Service Order (DSO) on 29 November 1900, and was appointed a Companion of the Order of the Bath (CB) in the October 1902 South African honours list. 

Following his return to the United Kingdom, he was promoted lieutenant-colonel on 28 October 1902, and appointed in command of the 2nd battalion, Grenadier Guards. He served as Gentleman Usher of the Green Rod (Order of the Thistle) from 1917 until his death. He was also a JP and DL.

He was later a Captain of the Royal Company of Archers, and was on 29 July 1926 created a Baronet, of Liberton and Craigmillar in the County of Midlothian.

From 1897 to 1938, he served as a member of the ruling council of the influential Edinburgh conservationist group the Cockburn Association.

He lived in Inch House a large 17th-century house on the south side of Edinburgh.

He was born Robert Gordon Wolrige in 1857, became Robert Gordon Wolrige Gordon in 1864, Robert Gordon Gordon Wolrige in 1873 and added the name Gilmour on succeeding to the estates of his great uncle, W L Gilmour of Craigmillar.

Family
Gilmour married on 19 October 1889 Lady Susan Lygon (24 May 1870 – 28 January 1962), 2nd daughter of the 6th Earl of Beauchamp. They had four children:

Sir John Little Gilmour, 2nd Bt. (1899–1977)
Mary Gilmour (1890-1978), married Sir Hughe Montgomery Knatchbull-Hugessen 
Margaret Gilmour (b.1892), married Dugdale 
Grizel Gilmour (1894–1975) who married in 1919 Hon Arthur Oswald James Hope (1897–1958), who became 2nd Baron Rankeillour in 1949.

Lady Susan Gordon Gilmour
Lady Susan Gordon Gilmour (24 May 1870 – 28 January 1962) was created a Dame Commander of the Order of the British Empire in 1936 "[f]or services in connection with the Queen's Institute of District Nursing in Scotland." She died in 1962, aged 91.

References

1857 births
1939 deaths
Baronets in the Baronetage of the United Kingdom
British Army brigadiers
Members of the Royal Company of Archers
Grenadier Guards officers
Companions of the Order of the Bath
Companions of the Distinguished Service Order
British Army personnel of the Second Boer War
Commanders of the Royal Victorian Order
Scottish justices of the peace